Pete Sampras defeated Jim Courier in the final, 7–6(7–3), 7–6(8–6), 3–6, 6–3 to win the gentlemen's singles tennis title at the 1993 Wimbledon Championships. It was the first of an eventual seven Wimbledon titles for Sampras, an all-time record shared with William Renshaw until 2017 when Roger Federer won his eighth title.

Andre Agassi was the defending champion, but was defeated in the quarterfinals by Sampras.

This marked Ivan Lendl's final Wimbledon appearance; he lost in the second round. He was a runner-up in two Wimbledon finals. This was the only major he did not win in his career.

Seeds

  Pete Sampras (champion)
  Stefan Edberg (semifinals)
  Jim Courier (final)
  Boris Becker (semifinals)
  Goran Ivanišević (third round)
  Michael Stich (quarterfinals)
  Ivan Lendl (second round)
  Andre Agassi (quarterfinals)
  Richard Krajicek (fourth round)
  Andrei Medvedev (second round)
  Petr Korda (fourth round)
  Michael Chang (third round)
  Wayne Ferreira (fourth round)
  MaliVai Washington (second round)
  Karel Nováček (first round)
  Thomas Muster (first round)

Qualifying

Draw

Finals

Top half

Section 1

Section 2

Section 3

Section 4

Bottom half

Section 5

Section 6

Section 7

Section 8

References

External links

 1993 Wimbledon Championships – Men's draws and results at the International Tennis Federation

Men's Singles
Wimbledon Championship by year – Men's singles